This is a list of cathedrals in Iraq sorted by denomination.

Chaldean and Syriac Catholic
Cathedrals of the Chaldean and Syriac Catholic Churches in Iraq:
Cathedral of Mary Mother of Sorrows in Baghdad Chaldean Catholic Church.
Cathedral of St. Joseph in Baghdad
Sayidat al-Nejat Cathedral in Baghdad (Syrian/Antiochian Rite)
Cathedral of Our Lady of Nareg in Baghdad (Armenian Rite)
Cathedral of Our Lady in Mosul Chaldean Catholic Rite
St. Joseph in Ankawa (Chaldean Rite)
Cathedral of the Sacred Heart in Kirkuk (Chaldean Rite)
 Cathedral of the Sacred Heart, Kirkuk 
 Syriac Cathedral, Al-Mosul 
 Cathedral of Our Lady, Al-Mosul
 Chaldean Catholic Archeparchy of Mosul Cathedral
 Cathedral of St. George, Alquoch 
 Cathedral Mar Aeth Alaha, Duhok

Assyrian Church of the East
Saint Ahoadamah Church, Tikrit
St. Zay'ā Cathedral (Assyrian Church of the East), Mechanics’ Quarter, Dora, Baghdad

See also

List of cathedrals
Christianity in Iraq

References

Cathedrals in Iraq
Iraq
Cathedrals
Cathedrals